The Association of Psychiatric Social Workers (APSW) was the main professional body for social workers looking after the welfare of mentally ill people in the United Kingdom from 1929 to 1970.

In 1970 the association merged with six other social workers' organisations to form the British Association of Social Workers, having been a member of the Standing Conference of Organisations of Social Workers since 1962.

The archives of the Association are held at Warwick University.

References

External links
Catalogue of the APSW archives, held at the Modern Records Centre, University of Warwick

Social work organisations in the United Kingdom
Former mental health organisations in the United Kingdom
History of mental health in the United Kingdom
Organizations established in 1929
Organizations disestablished in 1970